The 1st Infantry Division, was one of the original infantry divisions of the Reichswehr and Wehrmacht that served throughout World War II.

History

Before World War II 
The staff of the 1st Infantry Division was initially assembled under the cover name of Artillery Leader 1 in October 1934. Its initial headquarters were at Königsberg. On 15 October 1935, the formation was redesignated as the 1st Infantry Division. It was redeployed to Insterburg on 3 February 1936. The division initially contained the Infantry Regiments 1 (Königsberg), 22 (Gumbinnen), and 43 (Insterburg), as well as Artillery Regiment 1 (Königsberg). The division was built from the Reichswehr-era 1st Infantry Regiment, assembled largely from East Prussian personnel and adopted a strongly Prussian internal culture, as underlined by the black-and-white divisional insignia.

The divisional commander from 1 October 1934 until 1 October 1935 was Georg von Küchler, who later went on to be the army-level commanding general that the 1st Infantry Division served under starting in September 1939. Küchler was replaced as divisional commander by Walther Schroth on 1 October 1935, who was in turn replaced by Joachim von Kortzfleisch on 1 January 1938.

On 17 August 1939, the 1st Infantry Division initiated mobilization procedures as part of the German preparations for the Invasion of Poland.

World War II

Invasion of Poland 
With the German Invasion of Poland in September 1939, the 1st Infantry Division fought in the northern sector. The division advanced toward Warsaw as a component of the XXVI Army Corps (until 1 October 1939: "Army Corps Wodrig", commanded by Albert Wodrig), subordinate to the 3rd Army (Georg von Küchler). The division's commanding general was Joachim von Kortzfleisch, while the chief of staff and head of logistics were Major Johannes Steffler and Captain Christian Müller.

On 1 September 1939, it captured Kuklin on the left flank of the 3rd Army. It engaged Polish forces near the heavily defended town of Mława (Battle of Mława) for several days, then crossed over the Bug and Narew Rivers. On 8 September 1939, 1st and 12th Infantry Divisions captured the Ostrów Mazowiecka region. On September 10th, the 1st and 12th Infantry Divisions formed a bridgehead south of Brok and Małkinia Górna. On the 12th, the 1st Infantry Division reached the road between Kałuszyn and Siedlce, where it was engaged by Polish counterattacks on its left flank. On 16 September, Wodrig Corps met heavy resistance from scattered Polish formations; the nearby 12th Infantry Division secured the Kałuszyn-Latowicz area, whereas 1st Infantry Division itself was assigned to the area east of Garwolin.

The strategic balance of the German campaign in Poland was decisively altered by the Soviet invasion of Poland that started on 17 September 1939; the 1st Infantry Division was subsequently deployed to the Stanisławów area, with 12th Infantry Division assigned further south in Mińsk Mazowiecki, with both division participating in the Siege of Warsaw. Two days later, 1st Infantry Division advanced to Łochów.

Battle of France 
Playing a minor role in the invasion of France, the division returned to East Prussia in the autumn of 1940.

Eastern Front 
With the launch of Operation Barbarossa, the 1st Infantry Division participated in the Baltic Operation as part of the 18th Army with Army Group North, advancing on Leningrad. It remained and fought in the area of Leningrad and Lake Ladoga through December 1943. (See Siege of Leningrad.) Transferred to the 1st Panzer Army, the division fought at Krivoy Rog and broke out of an encirclement in March 1944.

Defence of East Prussia 
The 1st Infantry Division returned to its native East Prussia in the summer 1944. Except for participating in the urgent and temporary link-up with the now-isolated Army Group North in Lithuania (Operation Doppelkopf), the unit remained to defend the easternmost German province from the advancing Red Army. Alternating between 3rd Panzer and 4th Armies, the division was trapped in the Königsberg/Samland area after it was cut off from the rest of Germany by end January 1945.

At 0400 hours on 19 February 1945, elements of the 1st Infantry, led by a captured Soviet T-34 tank, spearheaded a westward offensive from Königsberg intended to link with General Hans Gollnick's XXVIII Corps, which held parts of the Samland peninsula, including the vital port of Pillau. Capturing the town of Metgethen, the unit opened the way for the 5th Panzer Division to join with Gollnick's forces near the town of Gross Heydekrug the next day. This action re-opened the land route from Königsberg to Pillau, allowing for the evacuation of civilian refugees via the port and solidifying the German defense of the area until April.

With the capitulation of Königsberg on 9 April 1945, the surviving elements of the division retreated to Pillau where most later surrendered to the Soviets and parts of the division where evacuated by sea and surrendered to the British in Schleswig-Holstein at the end of the war.

Organization
The 1st Infantry Division was a "Wave 1" division, meaning it existed prior to the outbreak of the war. It was equipped and organized along standard lines for a German infantry division. Its original form in 1934 consisted of two infantry regiments, an artillery regiment, a pioneer battalion, and a signals unit.

The division invaded Poland with the following units under command:
1st Infantry Regiment
22nd Infantry Regiment
43rd Infantry Regiment
1st Artillery Regiment
37th Artillery Regiment
31st Machine-gun Battalion
1st Anti-tank Battalion
1st Reconnaissance Battalion
1st Engineer Battalion
1st Signals Battalion
1st Medical Battalion

Commanders
The following officers commanded the 1st Infantry Division:
 Oct 1, 1934, to Apr 1, 1935: Generalmajor Georg von Küchler
 Apr 1, 1935, to Jan 1, 1938: Generalleutnant Walther Schroth
 Jan 1, 1938 to Apr 14, 1940: Generalleutnant Joachim von Kortzfleisch
 Apr 14, 1940, to Jul 12, 1941: Generalleutnant Philipp Kleffel
 Jul 12, 1941, to Sept 4, 1941: Generalmajor Dr. Friedrich Altrichter
 Sept 4, 1941, to Jan 16, 1942: Generalleutnant Philipp Kleffel
 Jan 16, 1942 to Jun 30, 1943: Generalleutnant Martin Grase
 Jul 1, 1943, to May 10, 1944: Generalleutnant Ernst-Anton von Krosigk
 May 10, 1944, to Jun 8, 1944: Oberst Hans-Joachim Baurmeister
 Jun 8, 1944 to Sept 30, 1944: Generalleutnant Ernst-Anton von Krosigk
 Oct 1, 1944, to Feb 28, 1945: Generalleutnant Hans Schittnig
 Feb 28, 1945 to Apr 26, 1945: Generalleutnant Henning von Thadden

Operational history
 Invasion of Poland, as part of Army Group North:
 Sept. 1939: Fought in Poland under 3.Armee of German Army Group North
 Invasion of France as part of Army Group B:
 May 1940: Reserve division of 6.Armee of German Army Group B in Belgium
 June 1940: Fought in France under I.Armeekorps of 4.Armee
 Jul–Aug. 1940: Part of I.Armeekorps of 7.Armee along the Atlantic coast
 Sept 1940: Transferred to East Prussia under 18.Armee with Army Group B
 Invasion of the Soviet Union as part of Army Group North:
 June 1941: Attached to 18.Armee under Army Group North
 July 1941: Transferred to XXVI.Armeekorps under 18.Armee
 Aug. 1941: Transferred to XXXXI.Armeekorps of 4.Panzergruppe
 Sept 1941: Transferred to XXXVIII.Armeekorps of 18.Armee near Peterhof
 Nov 1941: Reserve division of 18.Armee near Leningrad
 Dec 1941: Joined XXVIII.Armeekorps near Leningrad
 May 1942: Rejoined XXVI.Armeekorps near Volkhov
 June 1942: Rejoined I.Armeekorps near Volkhov
 Jan 1943: Rejoined XXVI.Armeekorps near Ladoga
 Feb 1943: Joined LIV.Armeekorps near Ladoga
 Apr 1943: Rejoined XXVI.Armeekorps near Ladoga
 Sept 1943: Rejoined XXVIII.Armeekorps near Tigoda
 Summer 1942 campaign as part of Army Group South:
 Jan 1944: Transferred to reserves of 1.Panzer-Armee under Army Group South at Winnizia
 Feb 1944: Joined XXXXVI.Armeekorps in the Hube pocket
 Retreat through Ukraine as part of Army Group North Ukraine:
 Apr 1944: Joined III.Armeekorps under Army Group North Ukraine
 May 1944: Rejoined XXVI.Armeekorps under 1.Panzer-Armee at Stanislau
 Jul 1944: Joined LIX.Armeekorps at Brody
 Retreat into Germany:
 Aug 1944: Rejoined XXVI.Armeekorps under 3.Panzer-Armee of Army Group Centre at Schlossberg
 Feb 1945: Rejoined XXXXI.Armeekorps under 4.Armee at Königsberg
 Mar 1945: Reserve division of Armee-Abteilung Samland at Samland
 Apr 1945: Rejoined XXVI.Armeekorps under Armee Ostpreussen at Pillau

References

Citations

Bibliography
 Christopher Duffy. Red Storm on the Reich: The Soviet March on Germany, 1945. New York: Atheneum, 1991. pp 164,165,207 
 Samuel W. Mitcham: Crumbling Empire: The German Defeat in the East, 1944. Westport: Praeger, 2001. pp 66,141 
 Burkhard Müller-Hillebrand: Das Heer 1933–1945. Entwicklung des organisatorischen Aufbaues.  Vol.III: Der Zweifrontenkrieg. Das Heer vom Beginn des Feldzuges gegen die Sowjetunion bis zum Kriegsende. Mittler: Frankfurt am Main 1969, p. 285.
 Georg Tessin: Verbände und Truppen der  deutschen Wehrmacht und Waffen-SS im Zweiten Weltkrieg, 1939 – 1945. Vol. II: Die Landstreitkräfte 1 – 5. Mittler: Frankfurt am Main 1966.

0*001
Military units and formations established in 1934
1934 establishments in Germany
Military units and formations disestablished in 1945

de:1. Division (Militär)#Infanterie-Verbände